Setariopsis is a genus of New World plants in the grass family.

 Species
 Setariopsis auriculata (E.Fourn.) Scribn. - Mexico, Central America, Venezuela, Colombia, Pima County in Arizona  
 Setariopsis latiglumis (Vasey) Scribn. - Mexico

 formerly included
see Pennisetum Setaria 
 Setariopsis glauca - Pennisetum glaucum 
 Setariopsis italica - Setaria italica  
 Setariopsis verticillata - Setaria verticillata  
 Setariopsis viridis - Setaria viridis

References

Panicoideae
Poaceae genera